Khurram Parvez is a Kashmiri human rights activist. He is the Chairperson of Asian Federation Against Involuntary Disappearances (AFAD) and Program Coordinator of Jammu Kashmir Coalition of Civil Society (JKCCS). Khurram is a recipient of the 2006 Reebok Human Rights Award. Parvez was included in Times annual list of the 100 most influential people in 2022.

Personal life 
Parvez is married to Sameena Khurram and has a son.

Detentions

2016 arrest 
On 14 September 2016, he was first stopped by Indian authorities at New Delhi airport to prevent him from attending the 33rd UN Human Rights Council Session in Geneva to brief UN bodies, including the UN High Commissioner for Human Rights, and foreign governments on the alleged atrocities committed by Indian state forces in Jammu and Kashmir during 2016 Kashmir violence.

Parvez was later arrested on 15 September by Indian officials from his home in Srinagar. Later on 16 September 2016, Jammu Kashmir Coalition of Civil Society stated that Khurram Parvez has been detained without formal arrest or notifications, and in violation of his rights to information, and legal counsel. On 21 September, a day after a sessions court ordered his release, Khurram Parvez had been detained a second time under Public Safety Act (PSA). On 25 Nov 2016, Jammu Kashmir High Court quashed his detention, even then he was not released from prison. After 76 days of detention, on 30 November he was finally released from prison following the orders of Jammu and Kashmir High Court.

2021 arrest 
On 22 November 2021, Parvez was arrested by the National Investigation Agency, having been accused of "terror-funding" and "conspiracy". His home and office were raided.

References

Bibliography
 Listening to Grasshoppers: Field Notes on Democracy
 Kashmir: The Case for Freedom

Kashmiri human rights activists
People from Jammu and Kashmir
Living people
Year of birth missing (living people)